George Evans PC(I) (1655 – May 1720) was an Anglo-Irish politician.

Evans was the son of George Evans of Ballyphilip and Anne Bowerman. He was a supporter of William III of England during the Williamite War in Ireland. In 1692, he was elected as a Member of Parliament for Limerick County in the Irish House of Commons. He subsequently represented Askeaton from 1695 to 1699, and Charleville between 1703 and 1713. He represented Charleville from 1715 until his death in 1720. In 1717, Evans was made a member of the Privy Council of Ireland.

In 1679, Evans married Mary Eyre; they had three sons and seven daughters. Evans was succeeded by his eldest son, George Evans, who had been raised to the peerage as Baron Carbery in 1715.

References

1655 births
1720 deaths
17th-century Anglo-Irish people
18th-century Anglo-Irish people
Irish MPs 1692–1693
Irish MPs 1695–1699
Irish MPs 1703–1713
Irish MPs 1715–1727
Members of the Parliament of Ireland (pre-1801) for County Cork constituencies
Members of the Parliament of Ireland (pre-1801) for County Limerick constituencies
Members of the Privy Council of Ireland